Sonya Fitzpatrick is a British television and radio personality and a pet psychic. She hosted the now-defunct television show, Animal Planet's The Pet Psychic. Her weekly animal advice and call-in talk show, Animal Intuition, is now on SIRIUS Satellite Radio Channel 102.

A former model, she worked in all the major fashion capitals in Europe, appeared frequently on television and modeled for many noted designers.

In 1991 she moved from London to the United States.

She resides in the Conroe Woods subdivision in the Conroe, Texas area, outside Houston. Fitzpatrick, who divorced her second husband in 2005, remains single.

Sonya Fitzpatrick claims to have had, since childhood, telepathic abilities to communicate with reptiles, birds and animals of all kinds "so that she could help to solve behavioral problems and to help with their physical ailments." She has also helped many individuals reunite with lost pets. This includes bridging the gap between living owners and their pets who have died. She was featured in the HBO documentary, To Love or Kill: Man Versus Animal, exploring the relationship between humans and animals.

References

Further reading

Jansen, Steve. "Pet Sounds." Houston Press. Wednesday May 11, 2011.
Jansen, Steve. "Cover Story: Pet Psychic Sonya Fitzpatrick (Including Exclusive Video)." Houston Press. Wednesday May 11, 2011.

External links

Official website

British television personalities
Living people
Year of birth missing (living people)
Place of birth missing (living people)